Bathytoma coweorum is an extinct species of sea snail, a marine gastropod mollusk in the family Borsoniidae.

Distribution
This extinct marine species is endemic to New Zealand .

Description

References

 Maxwell, P.A. (2009). Cenozoic Mollusca. pp 232–254 in Gordon, D.P. (ed.) New Zealand inventory of biodiversity. Volume one. Kingdom Animalia: Radiata, Lophotrochozoa, Deuterostomia. Canterbury University Press, Christchurch. 
 Beu, A.G. 1970 Bathyal Upper Miocene Mollusca from Wairarapa District, New Zealand. Transactions of the Royal Society of New Zealand. Earth sciences, 7(12): 209-240

coweorum
Gastropods of New Zealand
Gastropods described in 1970